John Monk may refer to:

Jack Monk, fictional character in Monk
John Monke, English politician, MP for New Shoreham

See also
John Monks (disambiguation)